The 2nd Army Aviation Regiment "Sirio" is an Italian Army regiment based at Lamezia Terme Airport in Calabria. The regiment is part of the army aviation and assigned to the Army Aviation Brigade. Formed in 1996 the regiment is responsible for helicopter operations in southern Italy, and on the islands of Sicily and Sardinia. The regiment, together with the 4th Army Aviation Regiment "Altair", constitutes the Italian Army's general support aviation capability.

History

Formation 
On 1 October 1996 the 2nd Army Aviation Regiment "Sirio" was formed and the 12th Army Aviation Squadrons Group "Gru" was reformed at Lamezia Terme Airport. On the same date the 20th Army Aviation Squadrons Group "Andromeda" at Pontecagnano Airport was transferred from the Southern Military Region to the 2nd Army Aviation Regiment "Sirio". After its formation the regiment was assigned to the Army Aviation Inspectorate and consisted of the following units:

  2nd Army Aviation Regiment "Sirio", at Lamezia Terme Airport
 12th Army Aviation Squadrons Group "Gru", at Lamezia Terme Airport
 Command and Services Squadron
 121st Multirole Helicopters Squadron (AB 205 helicopters)
 122nd Multirole Helicopters Squadron (AB 205 helicopters)
 20th Army Aviation Squadrons Group "Andromeda", at Pontecagnano Airport
 Command and Services Squadron
 420th Reconnaissance Helicopters Squadron (AB 206 helicopters)
 520th Multirole Helicopters Squadron (AB 205 helicopters)

Naming 
Since the 1975 Army reform Italian army aviation units are named for celestial objects: regiments are numbered with a single digit and named for stars in the 88 modern constellationss. Accordingly, an army aviation regiment's coat of arms highlights the name-giving star within its constellation. Squadron groups were numbered with two digits and named for constellations, or planets of the Solar System. The 2nd Army Aviation Regiment was named for Sirius the brightest star in the Canis Major constellation.

On 18 September 1996 the President of the Italian Republic Oscar Luigi Scalfaro granted the regiment its flag, which today is decorated with one Silver Medal of Army Valour awarded to the then autonomous 20th Army Light Aviation Squadrons Group "Andromeda" for its service after the 1980 Irpinia earthquake.

Recent times 
On 1 October 1997 the 30th Army Aviation Squadrons Group "Pegaso" based at Fontanarossa Airport in Sicily was transferred from the Sicily Military Region to the regiment and began to move from Fontanarossa to Lamezia Terme. On the same date the regiment was transferred from the Aviation Inspectorate to the Southern Military Region. On 30 April 1998 the 12th Army Aviation Squadrons Group "Gru" was disbanded and its personnel and materiel integrated into the 30th Squadrons Group "Pegaso". On the same date the regiment was transferred from the Southern Military Region to the 2nd Defense Forces Command in Naples. On 15 November 2000 the regiment entered the Air Cavalry Grouping, which on 1 March 2006 was renamed Army Aviation Brigade. On 3 April 2001 the 21st Squadrons Group "Orsa Maggiore" based at Elmas Airport in Sardinia was transferred from the Sardinia Military Command to the regiment, but already on 31 July 2002 the group was transferred from the regiment to the Army Aviation Training Center. On 12 December 2002 the 20th Squadrons Group "Andromeda" moved from Pontecagnano Airport to Lamezia Terme Airport. On 24 June 2013 the 21st Squadrons Group "Orsa Maggiore" returned from the Army Aviation Training Center to the regiment. The same year the 20th Squadrons Group "Andromeda" was disbanded and its personnel and materiel integrated into the 30th Squadrons Group "Pegaso".

Current Structure 

As of 2022 the 2nd Army Aviation Regiment "Sirio" consists of:

  2nd Army Aviation Regiment "Sirio", at Lamezia Terme Airport
 Command and Logistic Support Squadron, at Lamezia Terme Airport
 21st Detachment "Orsa Maggiore", at Elmas Airport
 Command and Logistic Support Squadron
 Light Utility Helicopters Squadron
 30th Squadrons Group "Pegaso", at Lamezia Terme Airport
 430th Combat Support Helicopters Squadron
 530th Combat Support Helicopters Squadron
 Maintenance Squadron, at Lamezia Terme Airport
 Training unit, with AW169MA helicopters, at Lamezia Terme Airport

Equipment 
The 21st Detachment "Orsa Maggiore" is equipped with AB 412 helicopters, while the 30th Squadrons Group "Pegaso" is equipped with AB 412 and AB 212 helicopters. The Italian Army plans to replace both types with AW169MA helicopters from 2023.

See also 
 Army Aviation

External links
 Italian Army Website: 2° Reggimento Aviazione dell'Esercito "Sirio"

References

Army Aviation Regiments of Italy